The Aavoja is a  long river in Anija Parish, Harju County, Estonia that flows into Jägala river near Kehra.

The current source is located in Pillapalu village, just south of Koitjärve Bog. The upstream part of the river was dug in the 1930s to drain Aguparra Bog.

Väike-Aavoja and Aavoja reservoirs are located on the river. The river is part of Tallinn water supply system.

References

Rivers of Estonia
Anija Parish
Landforms of Harju County